Lily Dick (born 26 December 1999) is an Australian women's national rugby sevens team player. Dick made her debut in the 2018 Dubai Sevens, scoring a try 2 minutes after the end of regulation time to help the Australian side win a bronze medal in the third-place playoff.

Career
Dick represented the Palm Beach Currumbin Alleygators RUC as a junior rugby player. Dick made her senior debut for Queensland at the age of 16 at the 2016 National Rugby Sevens Championships in Adelaide. Dick backed up this performance by captaining the QLD youth team to victory at the Youth National Rugby Sevens Championships in Perth. Dick was the Vice-Captain of the Australian team which won a gold medal at the 2017 Commonwealth Youth Games. Her performances during the tournament saw her recognised as the Player's Player for the tournament.

Dick was a member of the Australian sevens squad that won a gold medal at the 2022 Commonwealth Games in Birmingham. She was a member of the Australian team that won the 2022 Sevens Rugby World Cup held in Cape Town, South Africa in September 2022.

Honours
 2019 RUPA Newcomer of the Year Finalist.
 2017 AON Uni 7s Dream Team.
 2022 HSBC World Series "Don't Crack Under Pressure" Award.

References

1999 births
Living people
Australian rugby sevens players
Australian female rugby sevens players
20th-century Australian women
21st-century Australian women
Commonwealth Games gold medallists for Australia
Commonwealth Games medallists in rugby sevens
Rugby sevens players at the 2022 Commonwealth Games
Medallists at the 2022 Commonwealth Games